This is a list of best-selling game consoles by region. This page consists of countries in Asia, North America, Europe, and other regions, which all used different analog television color systems; these being NTSC, PAL and SECAM. PAL broadcast at 576i, in Europe and Asia.# indicates Eighth & Ninth generation consoles.

Asia

Region-wide

Japan
Based on figures from Famitsu, unless cited otherwise.

China

Middle East

South Korea 
Most consoles have different names in South Korea, and had local Korean manufacturers.

Americas

Region-wide

North America

Canada

Mexico

United States
Based on figures from the NPD Group unless cited otherwise.

Brazil

Europe

Western Europe

France 
Based on GFK 2016 figures unless cited otherwise.

Germany

Spain

United Kingdom 
Based on figures from GfK Chart-Track, as of January 3, 2009, unless cited otherwise.

Other regions

Australia

South Africa

Unknown regions

Notes

References

Best selling game consoles
Video game consoles and handhelds
 
Video game console sales
Best-selling game consoles